is a Japanese professional wrestler. She is signed to Tokyo Joshi Pro Wrestling, where she is a record-tying three-time Princess of Princess Champion, a three-time Princess Tag Team Champion, and is also signed to All Elite Wrestling (AEW).

Early life
She attended a training school with aspirations for comedy. She later switched to wrestling.

Professional wrestling career

Tokyo Joshi Pro (2013–present)
Sakazaki made her professional wrestling debut for Tokyo Joshi Pro Wrestling, winning a tag team match on December 1, 2013.

In the summer of 2014, Sakazaki participated in the first Tokyo Princess Cup, defeating Kanna in the first round before losing to eventual champion Nonoko in the semifinals.

On June 4, 2017, Sakazaki defeated Yuu to become the Tokyo Princess of Princess Champion for the first time. On August 26, at Brand New Wrestling ~ The Beginning Of A New Era, Sakazaki lost the title in her first defense against Reika Saiki, ending her reign at 83 days. Throughout September and October, Sakazaki and her tag team partner Shoko Nakajima participated in a tournament to crown the first Tokyo Princess Tag Team Champions. The two won their first round and semifinal matches in the tournament and eventually defeated Maho Kurone and Rika Tatsumi in the finals to win the tag titles. On February 3, 2018, Sakazaki and Nakajima lost the tag titles to Neo Biishiki-gun (Azusa Christie and Sakisama). Later that year, Sakazaki again competed in the Tokyo Princess Cup, winning her first three matchups before losing to Yuu in the finals. On August 4, Sakazaki teamed with Mizuki (under the name Magical Sugar Rabbits) in the one-day Yeah! Metcha Tag Tournament, which they won by defeating Hyper Misao and Nakajima, the latter of whom Sakazaki won the Tokyo Princess Tag Team Championship with. Three weeks later, Sakazaki and Mizuki defeated Maki Itoh and Reika Saiki to win the vacant tag titles, marking Sakazaki's second reign as champion. The two held the title for ten months until they were defeated by Neo Biishiki-gun.

On November 3, 2019, at DDT Pro-Wrestling's Ultimate Party, Sakazaki defeated Shoko Nakajima to claim her second Princess of Princess Championship. On January 4, 2021, at Tokyo Joshi Pro '21, Sakazaki lost the title to Rika Tatsumi, ending her second reign at 428 days. On October 9, at Wrestle Princess II, Sakazaki and Mizuki defeated Neo Biishiki-gun to win the Princess Tag Team Championship for the third time. At CyberFight Festival 2022 on June 12, Sakazaki fought Nakajima for the Princess of Princess Championship in a losing effort. On July 9, at Summer Sun Princess, Magical Sugar Rabbits lost the tag titles to Reiwa Ban AA Cannon (Saki Akai and Yuki Arai), ending their third reign at 179 days. On August 14, Sakazaki defeated Miu Watanabe to win the Tokyo Princess Cup for the first time. On October 9, at Wrestle Princess III, Sakazaki defeated Nakajima to regain the Princess of Princess Championship for a third time. On March 18, 2023, at Grand Princess '23, Sakazaki dropped the title to Mizuki, ending her third reign at 160 days.

All Elite Wrestling (2019–present)
In 2019, All Elite Wrestling (AEW) announced that Sakazaki would wrestle at Double or Nothing, competing in the six women tag-team match. She participated in a triple threat match at Fyter Fest on June 29, losing to Riho after she pinned Nyla Rose. On February 5, 2020, Sakazaki made her debut on Dynamite defeating Britt Baker and being attacked by her after the match. After that, she stopped appearing for the promotion due to travel restrictions during the COVID-19 pandemic.

On February 15, 2021, Sakazaki made her AEW return to participate in the AEW Women's World Championship Eliminator Tournament. In the opening round of the Japanese side of the bracket, Sakazaki was victorious over Mei Suruga. She defeated Emi Sakura in the Japanese bracket semifinals on February 22 to advance to the next round, where she lost to Ryo Mizunami on an all-women's B/R Live special on February 28. On July 12, Sakazaki returned back to competing in AEW shows and she appeared on Dark: Elevation, facing KyLinn King which she was victorious. On the July 14 special edition episode of Dynamite titled Fyter Fest, Sakazaki's first time appearing on Dynamite in 16 months, Sakazaki faced Penelope Ford and again was victorious. On May 6, 2022, Sakazaki returned to AEW competing on Rampage by taking part in the Owen Hart Cup, where she faced Riho and lost.

On the January 16, 2023 episode of Dark: Elevation, Sakazaki returned and saved Zeda Zhang from an attack by ROH Women's World Champion Athena after their match. Two weeks later, Sakazaki teamed with Skye Blue and fought Athena and Diamante in a winning effort.

Championships and accomplishments 
 Pro Wrestling Illustrated
 Ranked No. 59 of the top 150 female wrestlers in the PWI Women's 150 in 2021
 Tokyo Joshi Pro Wrestling
 Princess of Princess Championship (3 times)
 Princess Tag Team Championship (3 times) – with Shoko Nakajima (1) and Mizuki (2)
 Tokyo Princess Cup (2022)
 Tokyo Princess Tag Team Championship Tournament (2017) – with Shoko Nakajima

Footnotes

References

External links

  
 

1992 births
21st-century professional wrestlers
All Elite Wrestling personnel
Expatriate professional wrestlers
Japanese female professional wrestlers
Living people
Japanese expatriate sportspeople in the United States
Tokyo Joshi Pro-Wrestling